National Tertiary Route 405, or just Route 405 (or ) is a National Road Route of Costa Rica, located in the Cartago province.

Description
In Cartago province the route covers Cartago canton (Aguacaliente, Dulce Nombre districts), Paraíso canton (Orosi district).

References

Highways in Costa Rica